Saint Alphys (in Italian: Sant'Alfio) or  is a comune (municipality) in the Metropolitan City of Catania in the Italian region Sicily, about  east of Palermo and about  north of Catania.

Saint Alphys borders the following municipalities: Adrano, Belpasso, Biancavilla, Bronte, Castiglione di Sicilia, Giarre, Linguaglossa, Maletto, Mascali, Milo, Nicolosi, Piedimonte Etneo, Randazzo, Zafferana Etnea.

References

External links
 Official website

Cities and towns in Sicily